Srđan Plavšić (born 3 December 1995) is a Serbian professional footballer who plays for Baník Ostrava on loan from Slavia Prague. He can operate as an attacking midfielder, side midfielder or winger.

Club career

Early years

Plavšić played in FK Vojvodina's youth system, but was told that he was too small to make it for Vojvodina's first team. He began playing football on a senior level with ČSK Čelarevo in the lower tiers of the Serbian football pyramid. He played in Čelarevo for two seasons before moving to Spartak Subotica. It was in Spartak where Plavšić made his debut in the Serbian top flight for the 2014–15 season, and he played impressively particularly in a match against Red Star Belgrade.

Red Star Belgrade
On 10 August 2015 Plavšić signed a three-year contract with Red Star Belgrade. In his promotion the following day, he chose the number 17 for his jersey. At Red Star, he got the nickname "Atomic Ant", due to his height of 166 centimeters, which at the time was the shortest among all of Red Star's players. In the first half of the 2015–16 season, Plavšić was statistically Red Star's most fouled player, as other teams' players would routinely accumulate yellow cards from tackling him.

Sparta Prague
Plavšić signed with Czech side Sparta Prague on 27 June 2017. The reported fee is believed to be around €1.3 million. He made his debut for Sparta in 2–0 defeat against his former club Red Star Belgrade on 27 July 2017.

Slavia Prague
Plavšić signed a three-year contract with Czech side Slavia Prague on 10 June 2021.

Baník Ostrava (loan)
On 8 September 2022 he was loaned to Baník Ostrava in Czech First League.

International career
Plavšić made his international debut for the Serbia national football team in a 3–0 friendly loss to Qatar. He also received a call for a friendly match against United States, on 29 January 2017.

Personal life
Plavšić's father Petar, also born in Novi Sad, was a professional futsal player during his youth. Srđan has credited his father for teaching him many of the tricks he plays in matches. Srđan's paternal grandfather is from Šipovo.

Career statistics

Club

International

Honours

Club
Red Star Belgrade
 Serbian SuperLiga: 2015–16

Sparta Prague
 Czech Cup: 2019–20

References

External links
 Srđan Plavšić stats at utakmica.rs 
 
 
 
 

1995 births
Living people
Footballers from Novi Sad
Association football midfielders
Serbian footballers
Serbia international footballers
Serbia youth international footballers
Serbia under-21 international footballers
FK ČSK Čelarevo players
FK Spartak Subotica players
Red Star Belgrade footballers
AC Sparta Prague players
Serbian SuperLiga players
Czech First League players
Serbian expatriate footballers
Serbian expatriate sportspeople in the Czech Republic
Expatriate footballers in the Czech Republic
SK Slavia Prague players
FC Baník Ostrava players